Springerichthys bapturus, known commonly as the Japanese blacktail triplefin, is a species of triplefin blenny in the genus Springerichthys. It was described by David Starr Jordan and John Otterbein Snyder in 1902. This species is found in the western Pacific Ocean from southern Japan to Taiwan. It feeds on algae and the adults occur in rock pools and just below the low water mark.

References

Japanese blacktail triplefin
Fish described in 1902
Taxa named by David Starr Jordan